In the United States, bingo is a game of chance in which each player matches the numbers printed in different arrangements on cards. The game host (caller) draws at random, marking the selected numbers with tiles. When a player finds the selected numbers are arranged on their card in a row, they call out "Bingo!" to alert all participants to a winning card, which prompts the game host (or an associate assisting the host) to examine the card for verification of the win. Players compete against one another to be the first to have a winning arrangement for the prize or jackpot. After a winner is declared, the players clear their number cards of the tiles and the game host begins a new round of play.

Alternative methods of play try to increase participation by creating excitement. Since its invention in 1929, modern bingo has evolved into multiple variations, with each jurisdiction's gambling laws regulating how the game is played. There are also nearly unlimited patterns that may be specified for play. Some games require only one number to be matched, while cover-all games award the jackpot for covering an entire card. There are even games that award prizes to players for matching no numbers or achieving no pattern.

Bingo played in the U.S. (75-ball bingo) is not to be confused with bingo played in the UK (90-ball bingo), as the tickets and the calling are slightly different.

Bingo cards

The most common bingo cards are flat pieces of cardboard or disposable paper which contain 25 squares arranged in five vertical columns and five side to side rows. Each space in the grid contains a number, except the middle square, which is designated a "free" space.

A typical bingo game utilizes the numbers 1 through 75. The five columns of the card are labeled 'B', 'I', 'N', 'G', and 'O' from left to right. The center space is usually marked "free" or "free space", and is considered automatically filled. The range of printed numbers that can appear on the card is normally restricted by column, with the 'B' column only containing numbers between 1 and 15 inclusive, the 'I' column containing only 16 through 30, 'N' containing 31 through 45, 'G' containing 46 through 60, and 'O' containing 61 through 75.

In u-pick 'em bingo and other variants of bingo, players are issued three 25-number cards which contain all 75 numbers that may be drawn. Players then mark which numbers they wish to play and then daub those numbers according to the numbers drawn. In addition, double-action cards have two numbers in each square.

A player wins by completing a row, column, or diagonal. The most chips one can place on a bingo board without having a bingo is 19, not counting the free space. (For this to happen, only one empty cell can reside in each row and each column, and at least one empty cell must be in each diagonal.)

In addition to a straight line, other patterns may be considered a valid bingo in special games. For example, a 2×2 square of marked squares in the upper-right-hand corner could be considered a "postage stamp". Another common special game requires players to cover the four corners. There are several other patterns, such as a roving 'L', which requires players to cover all B's and top or bottom row or all O's and top or bottom row. Another common pattern is a blackout, covering all 24 numbers and the free space.

Equipment
The numbers that are called in a game of bingo may be drawn utilizing a variety of methods to randomly generate the ball call. With the expansion of computer technology in bingo, electronic random number generators (RNG) are now commonplace in most jurisdictions. However, some jurisdictions require mechanical ball draws which may utilize a randomly shuffled deck of bingo calling cards, a mechanical ball blower that mixes ping pong balls with blown air or a cage which is turned to mix small wooden balls. All methods essentially generate a random string of numbers which players match to their bingo cards that have numbers on them.

Culture

Single games often have multiple bingos; for example, the players first play for a single line; after that, play goes on until a full card is called; then, play continues for a consolation full card.

Players often play multiple cards for each game; 30 is not an unusual number. Because of the large numbers of cards played by each player, most halls have the players sit at tables to which they often fasten their cards with adhesive tape. To mark cards faster the players usually use special markers called daubers. At commercial halls, after calling the number the caller then displays the next number on a television monitor; bingo cannot be called until that number is called aloud, however.

Bingo is often used as an instructional tool in American schools and in teaching English as a foreign language in many countries. Typically, the numbers are replaced with beginning reader words, pictures, or unsolved math problems. Custom bingo creation programs now allow teachers and parents to create bingo cards using their own content.

Terminology
Ready/Waiting/Cased/Set/Down/Chance/Shot/Pat/Open – A player who only needs one number in order to complete the Bingo pattern is considered to have a Shot or be Ready, Waiting, Cased, Set, or Down, or to "have a chance".

Breaking the Bubble or "Possible" – The bubble is the minimum number of balls required to complete the Bingo pattern. This is the earliest point any player could have a valid bingo. Example: Winning pattern is 1 hard way bingo, a straight line without the free space. The minimum number of called numbers is five (four if each number is under "N") although it is not considered Breaking the Bubble or possible until one number in each column or four/five numbers in a single column have been called.

Jumping the Gun/Premature Bingo/Social Error – One who calls bingo before having a valid bingo. The most common situation is someone calling bingo using the next number in the screen before it has been called.

Wild numbers – Many bingo halls will have certain games with a wild number. Wild numbers allow bingo players to start with multiple called numbers. Typically, the first ball drawn is the determining factor.

Standard – All numbers ending with the second digit of the first number. Example: First ball is 22. All numbers ending in a 2 including B2 is considered a called number.

Forwards/backwards – All numbers beginning or ending with the wild number. Example: First ball is 22. All numbers beginning or ending with a 2 is considered a called number. If the first number ends with an 8, 9, or 0, another number may be drawn as there are no numbers starting with an 8 or 9 and only 9 numbers starting with a 0. Some halls will also redraw a number ending with a 7 as there are only six numbers beginning with a 7.

False Alarm or Just Practicing – Tongue-in-cheek term used when one calls bingo but is mistaken. This could be because of mishearing the caller or stamping the wrong number by mistake. Someone who calls a "falsie" genuinely believes that they have a bingo. This is also known as a "social error". Another term used for this is a "bongo".

Hard Way Bingo – A hard-way bingo is a bingo pattern in a straight line without the use of the free space.

Reach – In Japan, a player will yell "Reach" when they are one space away from a bingo.

History

A game of chance named lotto was being played in Italy by about 1530. In 18th-century a home version (called Tombola) was created in Naples with the addition of cards, tokens and the calling out of numbers. In the nineteenth century a game like this was widely played in Germany to teach children spelling, animal names and multiplication tables.

The French game Le Lotto appeared in 1778, featuring 27 squares in a layout of three rows and nine columns. Five squares in each row had numbers ranging from 1 through 90, which led to the modern design.

In the early 1920s, Hugh J. Ward created and standardized the game at carnivals in and around Pittsburgh and the Western Pennsylvania area. He copyrighted it and published a rule book in 1933.

The game was further popularized by Edwin Lowe. While at a traveling carnival near Atlanta in December 1929 the toy merchandiser saw people eagerly playing a game called "Beano" following Ward's rules, with dried beans, a rubber stamp, and cardboard sheets. Lowe took the game to New York where friends liked playing it. The Lowe-produced Bingo game had two versions, a 12-card set for $1.00 and a $2.00 set with 24 cards. By the 1940s there were Bingo games throughout the US.

The origin of the name Bingo is unknown but may date to the middle 1920s. There are claims that one of Lowe's friends was so excited to have won that she yelled out "Bingo" instead of "Beano," or that the word echoes the sound of a bell.

The business of bingo

In the US, the game is primarily staged by churches or charity organizations. Their legality and stakes vary by state regulation. In some states, bingo halls are rented out to sponsoring organizations, and such halls often run games almost every day. Church-run games, however, are normally weekly affairs held on the church premises. These games are usually played for modest stakes, although the final game of a session is frequently a coverall game that offers a larger jackpot prize for winning within a certain quantity of numbers called, and a progressive jackpot is one that may increase per session until it is won.

Commercial bingo games in the US are primarily offered by casinos (and then only in the state of Nevada), and by Native American bingo halls, which are often housed in the same location as Native American-run casinos. In Nevada, bingo is offered mainly by casinos that cater to local gamblers, and not the famous tourist resorts. They usually offer one-hour sessions, on the odd hours, e.g. 9am, 11am, 1pm daily, typically from 9am through 11pm, with relatively modest stakes except for coverall jackpots. Station Casinos, a chain of locals-oriented casinos in Las Vegas, offers a special game each session, called "Jumbo" that ties all of its properties together with a large progressive jackpot. Most Bingo parlors in Las Vegas use hand held machines on which the games are played, except the Station Casino, the Fiesta Casino which has paper bingo cards and no machines. Native American games are typically offered for only one or two sessions a day, and are often played for higher stakes than charity games in order to draw players from distant places. Some also offer a special progressive jackpot game that may tie together players from multiple bingo halls.

As well as bingo played in house, the larger commercial operators play some games linked by telephone across several, perhaps dozens, of their clubs. This increases the prize money, but reduces the chance of winning; both due to the greater number of players.

Bingo halls are sometimes linked together (as by Loto Quebec in Canada) in a network to provide alternative winning structures and bigger prizes.

Bingo is also the basis for online games sold through licensed lotteries. Tickets are sold as for other numbers games, and the players get receipts with their numbers arranged as on a regular bingo card. The daily or weekly draw is normally broadcast on television. These games offer higher prizes and are more difficult to win.

The bingo logic is frequently used on scratch card games. The numbers are pre-drawn for each card and hidden until the card is scratched. In lotteries with online networks the price is electronically confirmed to avoid fraud based on physical fixing.

Some gay bars and other LGBT-oriented organizations in both Canada and the United States also stage bingo events, commonly merged with a drag show and billed as "Drag Bingo" or "Drag Queen Bingo". "Drag Bingo" events were first launched in Seattle in the early 1990s as a fundraiser for local HIV/AIDS charities. They have since expanded to many other cities across North America, supporting a diverse range of charities.

Bingo has gone beyond a fundraising role and is often featured in bars and nightclubs as a social and entertainment event, with both numbered and music bingo variations, attracting a loyal following of regular players. Many venues promote a bingo event to attract customers at off-peak times, such as weeknights and Sundays, which are traditionally slower for such businesses. The games are called by drag and non-drag hosts alike and often include ancillary activities such as cabaret shows, contests and other themed activities that add interest and encourage audience participation. Customers are invited to play for a chance to win cash and other prizes.

With one bingo hall for every 6,800 residents, Cheektowaga, New York is believed to have the highest concentration of bingo halls in the United States. The suburb of Buffalo's large Polish-American Catholic population is believed to be a factor for bingo's outsized popularity in Western New York, which has five times as many bingo halls per capita as the rest of the state.

Variations

U-Pick'Em bingo
A common form of bingo which allows players to mark the numbers they wish to monitor for a win. While this game closely resembles Keno, a game invented in China which predates the Han Dynasty, it is recognized as a variant of bingo and is permitted in almost all jurisdictions.

Shotgun Bingo
Also known as Quickie Bingo, Turbo Bingo and similar names, these games are often played in between regular games with cards sold separately from the main game package. Players typically only play one or two cards and the numbers are called as quickly as the bingo balls come out.

Quick Shot bingo
A game where numbers are pre-drawn and players purchase sealed bingo cards which are then matched against the pre-drawn numbers. If a specified pattern is achieved, then the player usually wins a prize according to a prize table. Some versions are played until a player achieves a top level prize and then new numbers are drawn and the game begins anew. This type of bingo may be played over days, weeks or months depending on the difficulty of achieving a top level prize.

Bonanza bingo
Typically 43 to 48 numbers are pre-drawn at the beginning of a bingo session. The numbers pre-drawn can be odd, even or the first 43 numbers that pop out the machine. Players purchase cards and mark out all even, odd or pre-drawn numbers. At a designated time, the caller asks if anyone has bingo. If no one does, the caller then draws one ball at a time until someone shouts bingo. This game is sometimes played as a "progressive" game, where the jackpot increases if no one hits bingo before the desired number of balls are called. If no one has achieved bingo before or on the desired ball count then the game is played again in another session in which the desired ball count increases by one and the jackpot is increased also. The player who hits bingo after the desired ball count does not win the jackpot but does win a consolation prize. If a player does hit bingo in the right number of numbers then they win all the money in the jackpot. The ball count goes back to 43 after the jackpot is won and the ball count increases by one until the jackpot is won again.

Facebook bingo
Bingo on Facebook differs from traditional online or land based bingo games. Most games feature 'power-ups' which give individual players an advantage on winning the game when using such power-ups. Players can also collect, buy and share virtual items with friends on the Facebook platform. This adds to the community element which is otherwise not experienced in other forms of online and land-based bingo.

Horse racing bingo
Up to 15 players are randomly issued a number from 1 to 15 which corresponds with the top row of the bingo flashboard. Numbers are then drawn and the first person to have all five numbers in their column be drawn wins. This is a fast-paced and exciting form of bingo typically played in fraternal organizations.

Table bingo
With the expansion of Tribal gaming across the US, there are numerous versions of bingo which now emulate the fast action of casino like table games but utilize the principals of bingo where players mark and monitor matrices cards with chips. Casino games like Roulette, Acey Duecy and Money Wheel have bingo counterparts that are permitted to be played under bingo licenses in many parts of the country.

Electronic bingo

The advent of computer technology in bingo has blurred the lines between traditional slot machines and bingo slot machines. To the average person, bingo-based slot machines are physically indistinguishable from an RNG based slot machine typically seen in Atlantic City or Las Vegas. These devices are commonly called Class II machines, because the federal Indian Gaming Regulatory Act separated bingo, including electronic and mechanical aids, where players play against each other, from Class III slot machines, where player play against the house.

As a result of the passage of SB1180 in 2017, the State of Arizona now allows technological aids for bingo games that functions only as an electronic substitute for bingo cards. These technological aids are not defined by Arizona law or regulation, but one such electronic technological aid consists of a system which includes a network linking player interfaces to a number drawing device (ball-draw server) and an electronic substitute for a "live" cashier. The player interfaces themselves do not contain random number generators or allow a player to directly deposit cash. Rather, the Arizona technological aid system allows a player to deposit money into a unique individual player's account, pay for the games played out of that account, and at the end of play redeposit the value of any unused games that player may have purchased or won back into that account. The system does not allow the player to print a redemption ticket or receive anything of value directly from the player interface.Music Bingo. Music Bingo is growing in popularity and is finding its way into bars, pubs and other events as bingo is already a familiar concept and when integrated with music, also results in fun and collaboration among players (singing along to the songs that are randomly played). Music bingo was first introduced as a game show in 1958 and continues to expand today.

Other forms
 Buzzword bingo (also called bullshit bingo)
 Bovine bingo (also called Bossy bingo), in which a bovine's defecation is used to draw the numbers
 Online bingo
 Lingo, a game show incorporating Bingo mechanics and five-letter words
 Slingo, an online game that blends slots and bingo
 Pinoy Bingo Night, a game show in the Philippines with Kris Aquino on ABS-CBN.
 Bingo America, a bingo-based viewer-participation game show on GSN
 National Bingo Night, a bingo-based viewer participation game show on ABC that ended in 2007

Themed variants of the traditional game include drag queen bingo, punk rock bingo, and beach blanket bingo.

See also
 Bingo (card game)
 Online bingo, Bingo played on the Internet
 Keno
 Screeno, Bingo played by movie audience members
 Lottery
 Lotería
 Pakapoo

References

External links
 BBC article on Bingo Calling

Bingo
Gambling games